Hadi Abbas (1915 – 1990s) was a football player and coach.

During the 1930s and 1940s, Abbas was considered as one of the most talented left sided forwards of his generation. He played for Al-Quwa Al-Jawiya and the Iraqi army national side in a career that spanned nearly twenty years.

He scored several important goals during his playing days, including one against Syrian club Al-Barada in 1938 while guesting for the Baghdad Olympic Club and one against the Polish Army in 1943.

After retiring he turned to coaching at Nadi Al-Feili in Baghdad and in 1958 he supervised the first Iraqi junior national side made up of the brightest prospects from Baghdad areas of Al-Rasafa and Al-Karkh. The group of youngsters included the likes of Abid Kadhim, Hassan "Balah" Ali, Husham Atta Ajaj, and Latif Shandal, all of whom would go on to play for the full national side.

He also had a hand at football administration, and in 1959 he was elected president of the Iraq Football Association, which he held for three years.

In 1959 during the qualifiers for the 1960 Olympic Games in Rome, Hadi took charge of the national side for the last three matches, having been Shawqi Aboud's assistant for the first match against Lebanon.

He was one of many sportsmen who held memberships with the Iraqi Communist Party that were rounded up and imprisoned by the new Baathist government after the bloody coup of February 8, 1963. He was later released by authorities but kept himself out of the limelight until his death. At the time of ruling Hashemite monarchy, Hadi had been incarcerated at the notorious Nugrat Al-Salman prison in Nassriya for his communist sympathies, and supervised the city's local youth team for a short spell.

References
http://www.iraqsport.com Player Database Hassanin Mubarak/IraqSport.com
http://www.startimes.com/f.aspx?t=1550544 Kooora Iraqia
http://www.palmoon.net/7/topic-3612-8.html Kooora Iraqia archive
http://niiiis.com/history1/hadi.html
http://niiiis.com/iraqcoaches1.html

Sportspeople from Baghdad
1915 births
1990s deaths
Iraqi footballers
Iraqi football managers
Iraq national football team managers
Association football forwards